The Chanac Formation is a Cenozoic Era sandstone geologic formation in the southeastern San Joaquin Valley, within Kern County, California.

Geology
The Kern River Series is divided into the lower Chanac Formation unit, and the upper Kern River Beds Formation unit, with the wedge of the Etchegoin Formation in the middle in the western section. It is composed of sandstone and cobble conglomerate. It overlies the Miocene period Santa Margarita Formation.

It preserves fossils dating back to the Neogene period.

Fossil content

Mammals

Carnivorans

See also

 
 
 List of fossiliferous stratigraphic units in California
 Paleontology in California

References

Neogene California
Geology of Kern County, California
Geography of the San Joaquin Valley